To Beast or Not to Beast is the sixth studio album of Finnish rock band Lordi, released on 1 March 2013. As is traditional for the band, their costumes were renewed again for the release of this album.
The album was produced and mixed by Michael Wagener and engineered by Shani Gandhi.
It is the first album to feature members Mana and Hella. It also marks the first and only appearance of former drummer Otus, who died in 2012.

In Germany the album was released in digipak covers. The album has been released as LP version in EMP store.

Track listing

Trivia 
 This album breaks from the Lordi tradition of having the first track being an SCG track; the SCG track on this album is instead the final track.
 It also breaks tradition with the album title. In all their previous albums, the album title is also the title of one of the songs (Bend Over and Pray the Lord, Get Heavy, Deadache, Babez for Breakfast) or the title is part of the lyrics in a song somewhere on the album (The Monsterican Dream are lyrics in "Blood Red Sandman" and The Arockalypse are lyrics in "Hard Rock Hallelujah"). This album, however, does not contain a song called To Beast or Not to Beast, nor is it anywhere in the lyrics for any of the songs. 
 The album title was originally planned to be "Monsterial Phonica". But after Kiss released their album "Monster", Mr. Lordi thought that their album's name was too close to that so the band changed it to be "Upgradead". However, the band did not consider it an A-class name. Just few months before the release of the album, Amen came up with the final title, which the band felt suitable and perfect.

Personnel 
Credits for To Beast or Not to Beast adapted from liner notes.

Lordi
 Mr Lordi – vocals, artwork
 Amen – guitars, backing vocals
 Mana – drums
 OX – bass
 Hella – keyboards, backing vocals

Production
 Michael Wagener – production, mixing, mastering, backing vocals
 Shani Gandhi – engineering
 Petri Haggrén – photography

Additional musicians
 Otus – drums (11)
 Mark Slaughter – backing vocals
 Terry LeRoi – backing vocals
 Jeremy Asbrock – backing vocals
 Clay Vann – backing vocals
 Tracy Lipp – backing vocals
 Ralph Ruiz – backing vocals

Charts

References 

2013 albums
Lordi albums
AFM Records albums